La Compañía is a Chilean town in the communes of Graneros in Cachapoal Province, O'Higgins Region.

See also
 List of towns in Chile

Populated places in Cachapoal Province